|}

The City and Suburban Handicap is a flat handicap horse race in Great Britain open to horses aged four years or older. It is run over a distance of 1 mile 2 furlongs and 17 yards (2,027 metres) at Epsom in April during the Epsom Spring meeting. Inaugurated in 1851 it originally attracted top-class racehorses in the 19th and early 20th century; today its importance has been eclipsed by larger stakes races with more valuable purses.

History
The City and Suburban Handicap and its companion race, the Great Metropolitan Handicap, were devised by London hosteler Samuel Powell Beeton who owned The Dolphin in Cheapside. The establishment was well known for gambling and was dubbed "the Tattersalls of the east end" by the racing public. In 1846 Beeton and a collection of other tavern owners (known collectively as the "Licensed Victuallers of London") raised £300 to establish a purse for the first running of the Great Metropolitan Handicap. The race was popular with the city betting houses and by 1851 Beeton had raised additional money by drafting subscriptions from both city and suburban gambling houses to establish a second race on Epsom Downs, the City and Suburban.

The inaugural race was run on 4 April 1851 where it was open to three-year-old and older horses of either sex that had won a stakes race worth at least 200 sovereigns in their career. The winner was required to pay £10 out of the purse to the Licensed Victuallers' Protection Society, a fund and charity for retired British pub owners. The first running was held on the New Derby course at a mile and a quarter and was close match between Lord Eglinton's 5-year-old horse Elthiron sired by Pantaloon and Mr. Carew's mare Eva, Elthiron winning by a head in two minutes and 25 seconds. Hostelers contributed to the winnings purse until 1853 when the Betting Houses Act outlawed gambling in taverns and public houses.

The Handicap attracted some top-class racehorses in the late 19th and first half of the 20th century. Several British Classic race winners such as Virago, (1,000 Guineas), Reve d'Or (Oaks), Sefton (Derby), Bend Or (Derby), Robert the Devil (St. Leger) and Black Jester (St. Leger) won the race. The American-bred gelding Parole also won the City and Suburban and the Great Metropolitan Handicaps on consecutive days in 1879. The caliber of entries has declined in recent years and the City and Suburban is currently not a graded stakes race.

In 1916 during World War I, turf activities at Epsom were curtailed and many of the spring races were run elsewhere. The equivalent of the City and Suburban, dubbed the "Suburban" Handicap was run at Lingfield Park in June and was won by Lord Carnarvon's colt Julian. The race was not held in 1917 and 1918 due to the war and was canceled in 1921 due to concerns over petrol and coal availability. At the onset of World War II, the racing meetings at Epsom Downs were suspended in 1940 and did not resume until the summer of 1946. The City and Suburban was reinstated at Epsom on 5 August 1946 to allow time for the course to be refurbished after the long hiatus.

Winners
The race has been won by several mares including the Oaks winner Reve d'Or. The first mare to win the City and Suburban was Butterfly in 1852 and the last was Starlet in 1990. The race was open to three-year-old horses in its early years, with the last three-year-old winner under the race's formal title being Mushroom (1911) and the last under provisional title, the "Suburban" Handicap, being Julian (1916).

Records
Leading jockey (6 wins):
 Morny Cannon: Reve d'Or (1890), Nunthorpe (1891), Reminder (1895), Worcester (1896), Newhaven II (1899), The Grafter (1900)
 5 wins: Fred Archer: Thunder (1876), Julius Caesar (1878), Parole (1879), Master Kildare (1880), Bend Or (1881)

1851–1911

1912–1987

1988–present

See also 
 Horse racing in Great Britain
 List of British flat horse races

Notes
 In 1916 the race was run at Lingfield Park in June as the "Suburban" Handicap due to curtailment of turf events during World War I.
 The 1921 Epsom Spring Meeting was suspended due to petrol and coal rationing concerns.
 The 1940–1945 Epsom Spring Meetings were suspended due to curtailment of turf events during World War II.
 The 1946 City and Suburban was held on 5 August at Epsom Downs to allow the racecourse to be refurbished.
 The 1991 race was run at Kempton.
 The 2008 race was run at Nottingham.

References

Racing Post

Epsom Downs Racecourse
Flat races in Great Britain
Open middle distance horse races
Recurring sporting events established in 1851
1851 establishments in England